Gandhinagar is an established upmarket residential area located in the south of Dharwad conurbation,India named after prominent Indian leader Mahatama Gandhi . It is located in proximity to Malmaddi and some Deccan areas of the city.

Location
Gandhinagar is located south east of Dharwad city which is 21 kilometres away from the city of Hubballi, The nearest railway station is Dharwad railway station in Malmaddi.

Localities
Gandhinagar consists of few smaller localities, Rajatgiri is the largest residential locality located in Gandhinagar it is a vast residential and commercial area adjacent to Saraswatpur. The other localities are Haripriya Colony and Dhavalgiri in the south.

Transport

Gandhinagar is well connected to Hubli-Dharwad Bus Rapid Transit System (HDBRTS) (Rapid transit) it is one of the stations of the HDBRTS corridor and one of the busiest BRTS stations in Dharwad during working days. 

In December 2022 Gandhinagar was connected to BRTS feeder buses named 'Chigari Samparka' on basis, NWKRTC has started operating feeder buses between  Navanagar (Hubli) to Gandhinagar. 

See also
Dharwad railway station
Malmaddi
Saraswatpur

References

External links

Gandhinagar
Dharwad 

Cities and towns in Dharwad district
Neighborhoods in Dharwad